Göingeflickorna was a girl vocal trio from Sweden, active between 1955 and 1975. It consisted of sisters Sonja Martinsson (1934–2013), Barbro Svensson (born 1941) and Agneta Gardelid (1945–2021)  Their major breakthrough came in 1961 with the song Kära mor. When Barbro left in 1975, Sonja and Agneta continued appearing together.

Svensktoppen songs 
Vår lyckodröm - 1962 
Där näckrosen blommar - 1963 
Säterjäntans söndag - 1965 
När Solen ler - 1974 
Balsalens drottning – 1980

References

1955 establishments in Sweden
1975 disestablishments in Sweden
Musical groups established in 1955
Musical groups disestablished in 1975
Swedish musical groups
Swedish girl groups